Robert Scott Smith (born March 4, 1972) is an American college football analyst for Fox Sports and the Big Ten Network. He played professionally as a running back in the National Football League (NFL) for eight seasons with the Minnesota Vikings, and played college football at the Ohio State University. Currently, Robert serves as the Founder/Chairman of Fan Huddle, an on-demand digital wellbeing platform offering content on wellness, mindfulness, and healthy living.

High school career 
Born and raised in Euclid, Ohio, a suburb northeast of Cleveland, Smith became the first player to win Ohio's Mr. Football Award twice (in 1988 and 1989).  junior at Euclid High School, he gained 1,564 yards on 177 rushes (8.8 yards per carry) and averaged 31 yards on 10 punt returns.  senior season in 1989, he gained 2,042 yards on 203 carries and scored 31 touchdowns and was awarded the Bobby Dodd National Back of the Year by the Touchdown Club of Atlanta. During his Panthers' career, he rushed for a total of 5,038 yards on 548 carries with 67 touchdowns.

College career 
Smith narrowed his college choices to Miami, USC, UCLA, and Ohio State.

Professional career 
Smith was selected by the Minnesota Vikings in the first round of the 1993 NFL Draft, the 21st overall pick. Although he suffered from a number of ailments in his first few seasons, he finally broke through in 1997 with 1,266 yards rushing. Smith's finest year as a pro came in 2000 at age 28, leading the NFC in rushing with 1,521 yards; despite being at the peak of his career, he retired after the season.

In eight NFL seasons, Smith rushed for 6,818 yards and 32 touchdowns, along with 178 receptions for 1,292 yards and 6 touchdowns, and only nine fumbles. He also returned 1 punt for 4 yards and 19 kickoffs for a total of 460 yards. Smith wore number 20 as a rookie in 1993, but switched to number 26 when it became available in 1994 and wore it until his retirement.

Records

NFL 
 Second all-time Minnesota Vikings record for career rushing yards (6,818). Passed by Adrian Peterson on September 9, 2012. The previous record was 5,887; which was set in 1979 by Chuck Foreman.
Holds the all-time NFL record for average yards per touchdown run at 27.2

After retirement 
Smith retired after only eight seasons in the NFL. He walked away from the game to pursue a career in medicine as well as to avoid any serious injuries. He has maintained a mostly private life since his retirement. He has mainly appeared as a guest on the ESPN news program Outside the Lines, as well as a college football analyst on various ESPN programs alongside regulars Rece Davis, Mark May, and Lou Holtz. Smith also works on the NFL Network as an analyst and has appeared on The Score to discuss the NFL.

Today, Robert is the Founder and Chairman of Fan Huddle, an on-demand wellness platform featuring content hosted by professional athletes and experts.

In May 2016, Smith left ESPN to work for Fox Sports and is currently an NFL game analyst on Fox Sports, paired with Chris Myers.

Smith founded the Robert Smith Foundation, a charity whose goal is to "provide financial and moral support for Children's hospitals and cancer research."

Smith made a cameo appearance in the TV series Mystery Science Theater 3000. He was in Season 8 Episode 3 The Mole People. He played a scantily clad, mute "hunk" given to Pearl (the series' antagonist) as a present by her minions.

2004 saw publication of Smith's book The Rest of the Iceberg: An Insider's View on the World of Sport and Celebrity.  In it he discussed his background, his time at Ohio State and the NFL, and why he retired.  He also analyzed the obsession placed on sports stars by the public.

Smith is an agnostic.

Smith is one of the amateur astronomers featured in science writer Timothy Ferris's 2007 PBS program, Seeing in the Dark, based on his 2002 book of the same name.

On November 1, 2013, Smith openly admitted to fighting alcoholism during his playing career on ESPN during an interview on SportsCenter. He explained he sought counseling and has been sober since the birth of his son, and that his family is his daily motivation to stay sober. He also appeared on ESPN's First Take with Stephen A. Smith and Skip Bayless talking about his alcoholism.

Smith lives in Texas.

References

External links
Fox Sports – Robert Smith

1972 births
Living people
American football running backs
College football announcers
National Football League announcers
Minnesota Vikings players
Ohio State Buckeyes football players
National Conference Pro Bowl players
People from Euclid, Ohio
Sportspeople from Cuyahoga County, Ohio
Players of American football from Ohio
African-American players of American football
African-American agnostics
People from Powell, Ohio
21st-century African-American sportspeople
20th-century African-American sportspeople
Ed Block Courage Award recipients